Ida Barlow (also Leathers) is a fictional character from the British ITV soap opera Coronation Street, played by Noel Dyson between 1960 and 1961.

Creation

Casting
Creator Tony Warren originally had Betty Alberge in mind for the part of Ida when writing the first scripts, but when Alberge auditioned everyone agreed she was more suited to the role of shopkeeper Florrie Lindley, leaving auditions for Ida wide open until Noel Dyson was found.

Background
Ida Leathers was born in 1916 to Nancy Leathers (Norah Hammond). Ida grew up to be a soft, caring, almost saintly woman and married the love of her life Frank Barlow (Frank Pemberton) in 1938. They went on to have two sons - Kenneth (William Roache) in 1939, and David (Alan Rothwell) in 1942, and thus Ida found her new place in life as housewife and relished it. She spent most of her time looking after her family and keeping the house running, rarely socialising in the Rovers at all.

Storylines
Ida was the perfect housewife and doted on Frank and her boys. Ida had a special friendship with the Barlows' next-door neighbour, Albert Tatlock (Jack Howarth), and visited him on a regular basis, unlike his daughter Beattie Pearson (Gabrielle Daye), which sometimes caused friction between the two women (or at least disparaging comments from Beattie), despite Ida's calm nature.

Ida's mother Nancy Leathers (Norah Hammond) moved into No.3 in 1961, due to her failing health, and no-one expected her to outlive her daughter. One day when Ida was visiting Beattie, concern grew when Ida never arrived. Later that day, Frank learned that Ida had been hit by the bus she was intending to catch and died. Ida's funeral episode saw a new peak in viewing figures for Coronation Street, with 15.6 million viewers tuning in.

Development

Departure and death
It was announced that Noel Dyson had quit the role of Ida, after less than a year, and that she was tired of playing her. It was then confirmed that the character would be killed off to increase viewing numbers. Ida was struck by a bus and Frank Barlow was devastated. Dyson played Ida in 41 episodes overall. Her final appearance was in episode 77; although no death scene was shown and the events of her death unfolded on-screen from the next episode onwards. She was the first regular character to die and the second overall (May Hardman being the first in episode 7).

References

Coronation Street characters
Television characters introduced in 1960
Female characters in television